Schnoor is a neighbourhood in the medieval centre of the German city of Bremen, and the only part of it that has preserved a medieval character. The neighbourhood owes its name to old handicrafts associated with shipping. The alleys between the houses were often associated with occupations or objects: There was an area in which ropes and cables were produced (string = Schnoor) and a neighboring area, where wire cables and anchor chains were manufactured (wire = Wieren).

Schnoor is also the name of the main street in this neighbourhood. Another street there is Marterburg.

History 

In the Hanseatic city of Bremen, the Schnoor was one of the poorer corners. While the rich merchants settled in the Obernstraße (Upper Street), which was meant as well geographically (ridge of the dune) as socially, or in the Langenstraße (Long street, along the Balge, Bremen's first harbour), the Schnoor developed in the 10th century as a district of fishermen. The inhabitants built thatched cottages on the little island between the rivers Weser and Balge. Therefore, during its first centuries it was liable to high floods.

The first ferry service was established here, and the first bridge crossing the Weser was built around the year 1240. You can find an old wall and parts of a round tower which was erected around 1200, near the so-called Marterburg.

In the 13th century Franciscan friars had settled and their St. John's church was constructed in the following decades.

Development 

Today the oldest houses date back to the 15th century. Most of them are from the 17th and 18th centuries. While other parts of Bremen developed with plots of about one square kilometre and merchant's villas, the plots in the Schnoor have areas which are just enough for a single houses on 55 square metres. The narrow streets were not suitable for the increase in traffic from the 19th century. The quarter became one of the poorest parts of Bremen, a situation that meant renovations were unaffordable.  During the Second World War the Schnoor suffered only slight damage, so that owners of the houses had to pay a Lastenausgleich after 1945. But by the mid-1950s the houses were in a pitiable state.

The Senate of the Free Hanseatic Town of Bremen decided in 1959 to rebuild the historic area of the Schnoor. House owners were invited to restore rundown buildings with financial support from the State of Bremen. This development was in contrast to the common practice in many towns and cities in Germany and Europe until the late 1970s.

The situation changed with the Venice Charter for the Conservation and Restoration of Monuments and Sites (1964) so that in 1973 the Schnoor became a historic district under official heritage conservation through the State Monument Authority.

One of the most famous houses which has been preserved in its original state is the Schifferhaus in the street of Stavendamm. Another historic building is the Landherrnamt (1856) which initially housed the authorities administering the State of Bremen.

The Birgittenkloster (Convent of Saint Birgitta), a small Bridgettine convent founded in October 2002 is located in the Schnoor, as is St. John's Church, a listed building with a history going back to the 14th century.

Literature 
Der Schnoor in Bremen. A portrait. Texts in German, English, French and Spanish. Edition Temmen, Bremen 2004.

References

External links
 Website of some merchants in the Schnoor
 Website of the Museum in the Schnoor

Populated places in Bremen (city)
Streets in Bremen (city)
Pedestrian streets in Germany